Australasian Palaeontologists was formerly known as The Association of Australasian Palaeontologists, which was a specialist group of the Geological Society of Australia for palaeontologists in Australia. In 2015 members elected to shorten the name from The Association of Australasian Palaeontologists to Australasian Palaeontologists.

Publications
Alcheringa - quarterly publication of the AAP (published through Taylor & Francis)
Memoirs of the AAP - occasional publication covering large paleontological articles
Nomen Nudum - newsletter of the AAP

References

External links
aap.gsa.org.au - official website of the Association of Australasian Palaeontologists
gsa.org.au - official website of the Geological Society of Australia

Palaeontologists
1974 establishments in Australia
Paleontology